Jeune Ballet de France was a French ballet company founded by Petrus Bosman in 1974, based on the facilities of Rosella Hightower's École Superieure de Danse de Cannes, on the Riviera. It toured in Europe, Australia, and the Far East but was active for only a few years. A new company, using the same name, was founded by Robert Berthier in 1983. The current ballet master is Jean Marion.

External links 
 Paris when it Sizzles , Behind Ballet
 Dance Magazine, 1996

 
Ballet companies in France
1974 establishments in France
Performing groups established in 1974